DORADORA is the sixth extended play released by South Korean boy band U-KISS. It is the first EP to be released after their 8 months hiatus due to their activities in Japan. It was released on April 25, 2012.

Background
Just after they wrapped up with their First Japan Nationwide Live Tour to promote their Japanese album, A Shared Dream, U-KISS reportedly recorded a total of 100 songs from international music producers for their comeback in South Korea. The group worked with famous producers Kim Hyung Seok and Brian Kim of Zigzag Note. U-KISS and NH Media reportedly had a hard time selecting the title track from the album, so they seek help from various famous composers who can assist them in the selection process. On April 16, 2012, the management announced that DORADORA will be the album's name, as well as the title for their carrier single. Singer-songwriter Jay Park contributed the "4U (For You)" at the request of long-time friend, main vocalist Soohyun, who is a former JYP Entertainment trainee. A representative of NH Media stated, "...this will be the band's first release since becoming an international K-pop sensation and the band is getting ready to wow the fans...". It is the first time that the group worked with Kim Hyun Suk whom contributed a lot for the album.

Release
After 8 months of hiatus due to their busy promotional activities in Japan, U-KISS released this mini-album on April 25, 2012, physically and online. The song composed by AJ entitled AMAZING was released weeks prior to the album release. The teaser for DORADORA was also released on April 21, 2012, that made U-KISS to trend first spot worldwide on Twitter.
Kpop News

Track listing

Chart performance

Singles charts

Other songs charted

In May 2012, DORADORA gained first spot on Germany's German Asian Music Chart for the month of May beating BIGBANG's Fantastic Baby.

References

External links
 Official website 
 Official website 

2012 EPs
U-KISS EPs
Korean-language EPs